Fauoa Maani MBE is a Tuvaluan politician.

He worked as a journalist and served as clerk to the national Parliament, and was named Member of the Order of the British Empire (MBE) in 2009, a title awarded to him in recognition of his "public service and service to the community".

The following year, he went into politics, standing for Parliament in the 2010 general election and was elected as MP for the constituency of Niutao. Following the election, he was appointed as Minister for Health in Prime Minister Maatia Toafa's Cabinet. He lost office just three months later, when Toafa's government was brought down by a motion of no confidence.

On 5 August 2013 Maani became the Minister of Education, Youth, Sports and Health; and served as the minister during the Sopoaga Ministry.

References

Government ministers of Tuvalu
Members of the Parliament of Tuvalu
People from Niutao
Living people
Members of the Order of the British Empire
Year of birth missing (living people)